Petticoat Loose is a 1922 British silent drama film directed by George Ridgwell and starring Dorinea Shirley, Warwick Ward and Lionelle Howard. It is based on the 1898 novel of the same title by Eliza Humphreys about a playwright who hypnotises the woman he loves, controlling and ruining her life.

It was made by Stoll Pictures at the company's Cricklewood Studios in London. The film's sets were designed by the art director Walter W. Murton. Location shooting took place in Cornwall.

Cast
 Dorinea Shirley as Brianna Lynch  
 Warwick Ward as Ralmere Clive 
 Lionelle Howard as Mickey Croome  
 Jack Trevor as Max Lorraine  
 Margaret Hope as Ray St. Vincent  
 Kate Gurney as Sally Dunne 
 Frank Goldsmith as Lord Farlingham  
 Madame d'Esterre as Lady Kilmurran 
 Sunday Wilshin as Nurse  
 Colin Bell as Maid

References

Bibliography
 Goble, Alan. The Complete Index to Literary Sources in Film. Walter de Gruyter, 1999.
 Palmer, Scott. British Film Actors' Credits, 1895-1987. McFarland, 1988.
 Hunter, I.Q., Porter, Laraine & Smith, Justin. The Routledge Companion to British Cinema History. Taylor & Francis, 2017.

External links

1922 films
1922 drama films
British drama films
British silent feature films
Films directed by George Ridgwell
Stoll Pictures films
Films shot in Cornwall
Films shot at Cricklewood Studios
Films based on British novels
British black-and-white films
1920s English-language films
1920s British films
Silent drama films